The Piano Concerto No. 2 in G minor, Op. 23 by Dmitry Kabalevsky was composed in 1935 (just a few years after he joined the faculty of the Moscow Conservatory) and then revised in 1973. It is considered in some quarters to be the composer's masterpiece. 
Its first performance was given in Moscow on May 12, 1936. 
It consists of three movements:

I. Allegro moderato
II. Andantino semplice
III. Allegro molto

Though heavily influenced by Prokofiev, the composer nevertheless maintains his own distinctive style throughout the work: sharp, bouncy rhythms and concise thematic building blocks, a well-spun, clever lyricism when the music turns from activity to melody, a clear-cut tonal scheme that nevertheless has room for more surprises and dramatic turns than one might at first suspect, and of course utterly idiomatic keyboard writing. The work demands a player with formidable technique.

References 

Concertos by Dmitry Kabalevsky
Kabalevsky 2
1935 compositions
1973 compositions
Compositions in G minor